Robert W. Hatch (November 16, 1924 – February 13, 2010) was an American football player and coach. He served as the head football coach (1952–1972) and head baseball coach (1951–1954) at Bates College in Lewiston, Maine. He also served as the school's athletic director and instructor in physical education.

Hatch as a graduate of Boston University, where he played college football. He was twice drafted by teams in the National Football League (NFL), first by the New York Giants in the 1948 NFL Draft and later by the Baltimore Colts in the 1950 AAFC dispersal draft.

References

External links
 

1924 births
2010 deaths
American football halfbacks
American football quarterbacks
Bates Bobcats athletic directors
Bates Bobcats baseball coaches
Bates Bobcats football coaches
Boston University Terriers football players
People from Melrose, Massachusetts
Players of American football from Massachusetts
Sportspeople from Middlesex County, Massachusetts